The Zip drive is a removable floppy disk storage system that was introduced by Iomega in late 1994. Considered medium-to-high-capacity at the time of its release, Zip disks were originally launched with capacities of 100 MB, then 250 MB, and finally 750 MB.

The format became the most popular of the superfloppy products which filled a niche in the late 1990s portable storage market. However, it was never popular enough to replace the -inch floppy disk. Zip drives fell out of favor for mass portable storage during the early 2000s as CD-RW and USB flash drives became prevalent. The Zip brand later covered internal and external CD writers known as Zip-650 or Zip-CD, despite the dissimilar technology.

Overview
The Zip drive is a "superfloppy" disk drive that has all of the -inch floppy drive's convenience, but with much greater capacity options and with performance that is much improved over a standard floppy drive. However, Zip disk housings are much thicker than those of floppy disks.

In the Zip drive, the heads fly in a manner similar to a hard disk drive. A linear actuator uses the voice coil actuation technology related to modern hard disk drives. The Zip disk uses smaller media (about the size of a 9 cm (-inch) microfloppy, but more ruggedised, rather than the Compact Disc-sized Bernoulli media), and a simplified drive design that reduced its overall cost.

The original Zip drive has a maximum data transfer rate of about 1.4 MB/s (comparable to 8× CD-R; although some connection methods are slower, down to approximately 50 kB/s for maximum-compatibility parallel "nibble" mode) and a seek time of 28 ms on average, compared to a standard 1.44 MB floppy's effective ≈16 kB/s and ≈200 ms average seek time. Typical desktop hard disk drives from mid-to-late 1990s revolve at 5,400 rpm and have transfer rates from 3 MB/s to 10 MB/s or more, and average seek times from 20 ms to 14 ms or less.

Early-generation Zip drives were in direct competition with the SuperDisk or LS-120 drives, which hold 20% more data and can also read standard -inch 1.44 MB diskettes, but they have a lower data-transfer rate due to lower rotational speed.

The Zip drive was Iomega's third generation of products, different from Iomega's earlier Bernoulli Boxes in many ways, including the absence of the Bernoulli plate of the earlier products.

Interfaces

Zip drives were produced in multiple interfaces including:

 IDE True ATA (very early ATA internal Zip drives mostly sold to OEMs; these drives exhibit software compatibility issues because they do not support the ATAPI command set)
 ATAPI (all Zip generations)
 USB 1.1 (Zip 100 MB and 250 MB generations) 
 USB 2.0 (Zip 750 MB generation; backwards compatible with USB 1.1 systems)
 IEEE 1284 (parallel port) with Printer passthrough (Zip 100 MB and 250 MB generations) (See NB 3)
 IEEE 1394 (FireWire) (Zip 250 MB and 750 MB generations)
 SCSI (Zip 100 MB and 250 MB generations; both internal and external editions; external editions limited to ID 5 and 6)
 "Plus" (Zip 100 MB external drive with both SCSI and IEEE 1284 connections; SCSI ID limited to ID 5 and 6).

Parallel port external Zip drives are actually SCSI drives with an integrated Parallel-to-SCSI controller, meaning a true SCSI bus implementation but without the electrical buffering circuits necessary for connecting other external devices. Early Zip 100 drives use an AIC 7110 SCSI controller and later parallel drives (Zip Plus and Zip 250) used what was known as Iomega MatchMaker. The drives are identified by the operating system as "IMG VP0" and "IMG VP1" respectively.

Early external SCSI-based Zip drives were packaged with an included SCSI adapter known as Zip Zoom. The Zip Zoom is a relabeled ISA Adaptec SCSI host controller. Also, originally sold separately was a PCMCIA-to-SCSI adapter for laptop compatibility, also a relabeled Adaptec.

Interface availability:
{|class="wikitable" style="text-align: center; width: auto;"
|-
! rowspan="2" style="width:100px;"|Name
!colspan=5|Interface
|-
! style="width:60px;"|ATAPI
! style="width:60px;"|SCSI
! style="width:60px;"|LPT
! style="width:60px;"|USB
! style="width:60px;"|FireWire
|-
|Zip 100
|
|
|
|
|
|-
|Zip 250
|
|
|
|
|
|-
|Zip 750
|
|
|
|
|
|-
|colspan=6 style="text-align:left; font-size: 85%;"|

|}

Driver support:

 DOS (requires a minimum of a 80286 or processor)
 Microsoft Windows family (Parallel drives not supported on Windows 7 and above)
 Some Linux / BSD etc. (not universal)
 Oracle Solaris 8, 9, 10, 11 
 IBM OS/2
 Macintosh System 6.x,(See NB 1) 7.1–7.5, and Mac OS 7.6–9.2
 Mac OS X
 RISC OS Requires !zip drivers.
 AmigaOS 3.5 or higher
 IRIX 6.4 or higher (SCSI only)
NB 3: Requires a driver older than 5.x.

Compatibility
Zip disks must be used in a drive with at least the same capacity ability. Higher-capacity drives can read lower-capacity media. The 250 MB drive writes much more slowly to 100 MB disks than the 100 MB drive, and the Iomega software is unable to perform a "long" (thorough) format on a 100 MB disk (They can be formatted in any version of Windows as normal; the advantage of the Iomega software is that the long format can format the 100 MB disks with a slightly higher capacity. 250 MB disks format to the same size either way). The 750 MB drive has read-only support for 100 MB disks.

The retroreflective spot differs between the 100 MB disk and the 250 MB such that if the larger disk is inserted in a smaller-capacity drive, the disk is immediately ejected again without any attempt being made to access the disk. The 750 MB disk has no reflective spot.

Sales, problems, and licensing
Zip drives initially sold well after their introduction in 1994, owing to their low price and high (for the time) capacity. The drive was initially sold for just under US$200 with one cartridge included, and additional 100 MB cartridges for US$20. At this time hard disks typically had a capacity of 500 MB and cost around US$200 , and so backing up with Zip disks was very economical for home users—some computer suppliers such as Dell, Gateway and Apple Inc.  included internal Zip drives in their machines. Zip drives also made significant inroads in the graphic arts market, as a cheaper alternative to the Syquest cartridge hard disk system. The price of additional cartridges swiftly dropped further over the next few years, as more companies began supplying them. Eventually, the suppliers included Fujifilm, Verbatim, Toshiba and Maxell, Epson and NEC.  NEC also produced a licensed 100 MB drive model with its brand name.

Sales of Zip drives and disks declined steadily from 1999 to 2003.  Zip disks had a relatively high cost per megabyte compared to the falling costs of then-new CD-R and CD-RW discs.

The growth of hard disk drives to multi-gigabyte capacity made backing up with Zip disks less economical. Furthermore, the advent of inexpensive recordable CD and DVD drives for computers, followed by USB flash drives, pushed the Zip drive out of the mainstream market. Nevertheless, during their prime, Zip disks greatly eased the exchange of files that were too big to fit into a standard -inch floppy or an email attachment, and there was no high-speed connection to transfer the file to the recipient. However, the advantages of magnetic media over optical media and flash memory, in terms of long-term file storage stability and high erase/rewrite cycles, still affords them a niche in the data-storage arena.

In September 1998, a class action suit was filed against Iomega over a type of Zip drive failure dubbed the "Click of Death", accusing Iomega of violation of the Delaware Consumer Fraud Act.

In 2006, PC World rated the Zip drive as the 15th worst technology product of all time. Nonetheless, in 2007, PC World rated the Zip drive as the 23rd best technology product of all time despite its known problems.

Legacy
Zip drives are still used today by retro-computing enthusiasts as a means to transfer large amounts (compared to the retro hardware) of data between modern and older computer systems. The Commodore-Amiga, Atari ST, Apple II, and "old world" Macintosh communities often use drives with the SCSI interface prevalent on those platforms. They have also found a small niche in the music production community, as SCSI-compatible Zip drives can be used with vintage samplers and keyboards of the 1990s.

Zip disks were still in use in aviation until at least 2014. Jeppesen distributed navigation database updates, and Universal Avionics supplies TAWS, UniLink and Performance databases for upload into flight management systems via 100 and 250 MB Zip disks.

ZipCD
Iomega also produced a line of internal and external recordable CD drives under the Zip brand in the late 1990s, called the ZipCD 650. It used regular CD-R media and had no format relation to the magnetic Zip drive. The external models were installed in a Zip-drive-style case, and used standard USB 1.1 connections.

Iomega used the DirectCD software from Adaptec to allow UDF drive-letter access to CD-R or CD-RW media.

The company released an open standard CD-R drive and CD-RW media under the same ZipCD name.

Early models of ZipCD drives were relabeled Philips drives, which were also so unreliable that a class action lawsuit succeeded. Later models were sourced from Plextor.

The ZipCD 650 is able to record onto 700 MB CDs but can only burn data up to 650 MB. There is third-party firmware that forces the ZipCD 650 to be able to write data CDs up to 700 MB but makes the drive unstable.

See also

References

External links
 

Rotating disc computer storage media
Iomega storage devices
Floppy disk drives
Computer-related introductions in 1994